It's Your World may refer to:
It's Your World (album), a 1976 album by Gil Scott-Heron
"It's Your World" (song), a 2014 song by Jennifer Hudson